Flexibility is a personality trait that describes the extent to which a person can cope with changes in circumstances and think about problems and tasks in novel, creative ways. This trait is used when stressors or unexpected events occur, requiring a person to change their stance, outlook, or commitment. Flexible personality should not be confused with cognitive flexibility, which is the ability to switch between two concepts, as well as simultaneously think about multiple concepts. Researchers of cognitive flexibility describe it as the ability to switch one's thinking and attention between tasks. Flexibility, or psychological flexibility, as it is sometimes referred to, is the ability to adapt to situational demands, balance life demands, and commit to behaviors.

Measures/assessments
Due to the different facets of the definition of psychological flexibility, there are many problems when measuring it. There are multiple questionnaires that attempt to do so.

Acceptance and Action Questionnaire
The Acceptance and Action Questionnaire (AAQ) was developed in order to measure experiential avoidance. This test found that higher levels of avoidance were linked to higher levels of general psychopathology, depression, anxiety, fears, and a lower quality of life. It also measured avoidant coping and self-deceptive positivity. It was later decided that the AAQ actually measured psychological flexibility, not experiential avoidance. It was used until the AAQ-II was created.

Acceptance and Action Questionnaire II
The AAQ-II was developed in order to improve upon the faults of the AAQ. The original AAQ had faults in scale brevity, item wording, and item selection procedures that caused insufficient alpha levels to be obtained in measurements. The AAQ-II scores were found to predict many outcomes, including mental health and work absence rates. The AAQ-II also was found to be more psychometrically consistent than the original AAQ.

Laboratory measures of flexibility are consistent with how flexible people are in their actual lives. Flexibility measured in laboratory settings even predicted how flexible people will be in real life. More recently however, the validity of the AAQ has again been brought into question, primarily by inconsistent results. Recent studies have shown that both versions of the AAQ appear to measure the same thing, which is neuroticism/negative affect rather than experiential avoidance.

Impacts on life

Parent–child relationships
Research has shown that the relationship between parent and child distress may be influenced by parenting psychological flexibility. When parents are psychologically inflexible they cause more stress in their families. A similar study looked at the longitudinal relationship between perceived parenting style and psychological flexibility among students over six years (7th–12th grade). Results showed that psychological flexibility decreased with age, illustrating that as children grow older they become more set in their thoughts and habits, being less likely to change them due to circumstances. Results also indicated that authoritarian parenting styles predicted low psychological flexibility in children. This demonstrates that parents who over-control their children tend to restrict how well their children cope with stressors in life. Lastly, results showed that children with psychological flexibility in 9th grade were more likely to have decreases in authoritarian and increases in authoritative parenting style later on. Authoritative parenting styles seem to be associated with psychological flexibility in children. Authoritative parents tend to be more warm, fair, and encouraging than other parenting styles which may be why children raised by this style have more psychological flexibility. The children are encouraged to be independent and are supported, so they are able to adjust to situations that do not go as predicted.

Work environment
Psychological flexibility has been found to improve mental health and absence rates. A mediating variable is job control, which suggests that people feel they have more psychological flexibility when they have more control over their jobs. This is likely due to workers feeling less restricted by what they are allowed to do and more empowered to solve a problem. A longitudinal study on psychological flexibility and job control showed that these variables predicted workers' mental health, job performance, and even their ability to learn new software. The study demonstrates the power of psychological flexibility in the workplace as psychologically flexible workers have better mental health and job performance. Allowing workers more job control would likely increase work productivity as it would increase the workers' psychological flexibility. In leadership studies, flexibility, defined as "the ability to get along with different groups and adapt to the demands of many organizations," is one aspect of portability, or the ability to acquire skills and move from one company to the next.

Health
The ability to cope and be flexible was positively associated with improved psychological health. Flexibility reduced depression, anxiety, and stress. An in-depth experiment analyzed the relationship between difficulty identifying and describing feelings (DIDF) and psychological flexibility for men undergoing cancer screenings. Results showed that DIDF and psychological flexibility were reliable predictors of mental health. However, psychological flexibility only predicted mental health when DIDF was involved. Psychological flexibility allowed participants to have a better understanding of the subtleties of pleasant and unpleasant emotions. This understanding allowed participants to identify and describe their feelings better, thus enhancing their mental health.

A 2-year longitudinal study found that psychological flexibility helps with long-term emotional adjustment. People who are better at enhancing and suppressing their expression of emotions are less likely to be stressed over time. People with higher psychological flexibility are also able to have greater endurance, higher pain tolerance, and a quicker recovery rate to baseline levels when experiencing physical pain.

How to improve
Improvements can be made to psychological flexibility through training, such as through various forms of psychotherapy.

Acceptance and commitment therapy

The main goal of acceptance and commitment therapy (ACT) is to increase psychological flexibility. ACT is a form of therapy that aims to help people accept unavoidable events, identify actions that will lead to goals, and acknowledge thoughts rather than accepting or disregarding them.  When psychological flexibility was targeted in one study of ACT, there was a stronger reduction in psychological distress. There are six core processes in ACT interventions: acceptance, cognitive defusion, self as context, being present, values, and committed action.

Acceptance is taught in order to teach people to embrace their emotions, rather than trying to get rid of them. An example of acceptance would be when people feel angry and then choose to focus on the anger and accept that they are angry, rather than trying to unleash their anger to get rid of it. Cognitive defusion teaches people to not take their thoughts as literal in order to decrease the believability of negative thoughts and increase flexibility to behave as they want. An example of cognitive defusion would be when someone thinks "I am the worst," and then notices the thought for what it is—mere words—perhaps by saying to themselves "I am having the thought that I am the worst". This is in contrast to a cognitive therapy approach where the person might challenge the thought by thinking of things in which he or she excels.

Self-as-context attempts to have people create an awareness of their own experiences without being attached to them. This process is done in order to help people let go of specific content and experience themselves. Being present teaches people to directly experience the world by paying attention to the moment and being aware. An example of being present would be meditation and mindfulness. 
 
Values teaches people to take actions for chosen qualities. An example of this is somebody who chooses to continue to improve on being a father (chosen quality) by reliving painful childhood memories about how his own father parented him (action). The purpose is not to encourage pain, but rather to allow people to deal with pain for a valued choice, such as being a good father. Lastly, committed action teaches people to make changes in behavior in order for them to reach chosen qualities. Committed action involves identifying psychological barriers that will interfere with short, medium, and longer-term goals and then working through those barriers in order to reach the goals.

See also
 Adaptive performance
 Emotional regulation
 Integrative complexity
 Openness to experience
 Psychological resilience

References

Personality
Psychological adjustment